Mikheil Nariashvili (born 25 May 1990 in Kutaisi, Georgia) is a rugby union player who currently plays for Montpellier in the Top 14 and also plays internationally for Georgia as a prop.

Honours
 2015–16 European Rugby Challenge Cup : winner.

References

External links
"Itsrugby" profile

1990 births
Living people
Sportspeople from Kutaisi
Expatriate rugby union players from Georgia (country)
Expatriate rugby union players in France
Rugby union players from Georgia (country)
Georgia international rugby union players
Expatriate sportspeople from Georgia (country) in France
Montpellier Hérault Rugby players
Rugby union props